Beihu is a railway station on the Taiwan Railways Administration (TRA) West Coast line located in Hukou Township, Hsinchu County, Taiwan.

History
The construction of the station was completed in July 2012, as a result of TRA's policy of transforming its railroad lines into MRT-type railroad.

Around the station
 China University of Technology

See also
 List of railway stations in Taiwan

References

2012 establishments in Taiwan
Railway stations in Hsinchu County
Railway stations opened in 2012
Railway stations served by Taiwan Railways Administration